Waterville may refer to two different locations in the Canadian province of New Brunswick:

 Waterville, Carleton County, New Brunswick, a rural community
 Waterville, Sunbury County, New Brunswick, a rural community